Guy David (25 July 1947 – 30 August 2008) was a French football player and coach.

He played for Martigues, Cannes and La Roche Vendée Football.

After his playing career, he became a coach with Stade Raphaëlois, Fréjus, Toulon, Beauvais, Le Havre, Caen, Rennes, Nice, Martigues, Sion and Créteil.

He died of myocardial infarction after an ES Fréjus match.

External links and references

 Profile

1947 births
2008 deaths
French footballers
La Roche VF players
FC Martigues players
AS Cannes players
French football managers
SC Toulon managers
AS Beauvais Oise managers
Le Havre AC managers
Stade Malherbe Caen managers
Stade Rennais F.C. managers
OGC Nice managers
FC Martigues managers
FC Sion managers
US Créteil-Lusitanos managers
Ligue 1 managers
Association football forwards